Terminal 3 may refer to:

Art, entertainment, and media
 "Terminal 3" (song), the Irish entry in the Eurovision Song Contest 1984

Transportation

Airport terminals
 Beijing Capital International Airport Terminal 3 in China
 Ben Gurion Airport Terminal 3 the main airport in Israel
 Cairo International Airport Terminal 3 in Egypt
 Cancún International Airport Terminal 3 in Mexico
 Changi Airport Terminal 3 in Singapore
 Dubai International Terminal 3 in the United Arab Emirates
 Heathrow Terminal 3 in London, United Kingdom
 Indira Gandhi International Airport Terminal 3 in Delhi, India
 Málaga Airport Terminal 3 in Spain
 Manchester Airport Terminal 3 in the United Kingdom
 McCarran International Airport Terminal 3 in Las Vegas, Nevada
 Ninoy Aquino International Airport Terminal 3 serving Manila, Philippines
 Pearson Airport Terminal 3 at Pearson International Airport in Toronto,  Canada
 Phoenix Sky Harbor International Airport Terminal 3 in Arizona, United States
 Soekarno–Hatta International Airport Terminal 3 serving Jakarta, Indonesia
 Sydney Airport Terminal 3 in Australia

Seaport terminals
 Port of Richmond Terminal 3, a seaport in California, United States

Subway and train stations
 Terminal 3 station (Beijing Subway) on the Airport Express of the Beijing Subway, serving Beijing Capital Airport Terminal 3
 Toronto Pearson Terminal 3 station, a stop on the Link Train automated people mover at Toronto Pearson International Airport